This is a list of games released by Limited Run Games, an American video game distributor founded by Douglas Bogart and Josh Fairhurst.

Limited Run Games Collection

There are two types of games that Limited Run Games (LRG) sell; these are Numbered Titles and Distributed Titles, or more commonly known as "Distros".

Here are the platforms on which Limited Run Games are released or distributed on behalf of the producers. Numbered (#) releases are part of the Limited Run Games Collection.

LRG releases for the PlayStation Vita, PS3, PS4 and PSVR are part of one consecutive run.

LRG releases for the Xbox One and Xbox Series X are part of a separate run, starting from #001.

The PlayStation 5 and Nintendo Switch each have their own lines of released numbers, each starting from #001.

List of games released and distributed by Limited Run Games

References

Limited Run Games